Discovery Expedition is a South Korean clothing brand. As of 2016, the chain had over 120 retail stores in South Korea.

References

External links
 
 Discovery Expedition South Korea
 
 
 

Clothing brands of the United States
Clothing brands of South Korea
Warner Bros. Discovery brands